John Hart (1829 – 8 September 1896) was an Australian politician.

Hart was born in London in 1826. In 1886 he was elected to the Tasmanian House of Assembly, representing the seat of Deloraine. He served until his defeat in 1893. He died in 1896 in Deloraine.

References

1829 births
1896 deaths
Members of the Tasmanian House of Assembly